The 2011 Jade Solid Gold Best Ten Music Awards Presentation (Chinese: 2011年度十大勁歌金曲頒獎典禮) was held on January 8, 2012. It is part of the Jade Solid Gold Best Ten Music Awards Presentation series.

Top 10 song awards
The top 10 songs (十大勁歌金曲) of 2011 are as follows.

Additional awards

References
 B.tvb.com

Cantopop
Jade Solid Gold Best Ten Music Awards Presentation, 2011